Totowa (pronounced "TO-tuh-wuh" ) is a borough in Passaic County, in the U.S. state of New Jersey. As of the 2020 United States census, the borough's population was 11,065, an increase of 261 (+2.4%) from the 2010 census count of 10,804, which in turn reflected an increase of 912 (+9.2%) from the 9,892 counted in the 2000 census.

Totowa was formed as a borough by an act of the New Jersey Legislature on March 15, 1898, from portions of Wayne Township and the now-defunct Manchester Township.

Etymology 
The name of Totowa comes from the Native American name for the Great Falls of the Passaic River in nearby Paterson, and literally means "sinking or falling water", or "between mountains and water".

History
In 1696, George Willocks, a Scottish land speculator, purchased a tract of land known as Willock's Patent, which included most of modern-day Totowa, Woodland Park (formerly West Paterson) and Little Falls. Located in the western part of Manchester Township, Willock's Patent was resold to Anthony Brockholls and the Van Houten family.  The land was retitled the "Totowa Patent", and divided into three parcels, and more land was acquired through the "Garret Mountain Purchase".

In 1895, residents of the southern section of Manchester Township began to become disenchanted with governing officials, and following the election of 1896, many independent municipalities were formed. The formation of the Borough of Totowa was discussed at the Willard Park Hotel on Totowa Avenue, and headed by brothers Joseph and Robert Boyle. On March 15, 1898, the Borough of Totowa was officially incorporated under Chapter 56 of the Laws of New Jersey, signed by Governor John Griggs. On April 12, 1898, the first election of the Borough of Totowa was held at the Willard Park Hotel, which would become the unofficial town hall until the municipal building was completed in 1910.

Geography
According to the United States Census Bureau, the borough had a total area of 4.08 square miles (10.56 km2), including 4.00 square miles (10.36 km2) of land and 0.08 square miles (0.20 km2) of water (1.86%).

The borough borders the Passaic County communities of Haledon, Little Falls, Paterson, Wayne and Woodland Park.

Demographics

2010 census

The Census Bureau's 2006–2010 American Community Survey showed that (in 2010 inflation-adjusted dollars) median household income was $72,568 (with a margin of error of +/− $11,834) and the median family income was $82,750 (+/− $13,865). Males had a median income of $58,750 (+/− $10,202) versus $42,641 (+/− $10,936) for females. The per capita income for the borough was $35,978 (+/− $4,380). About 4.3% of families and 9.8% of the population were below the poverty line, including 8.8% of those under age 18 and 7.7% of those age 65 or over.

Same-sex couples headed 25 households in 2010, almost double the 13 counted in 2000.

2000 census
As of the 2000 United States census there were 9,892 people, 3,539 households, and 2,643 families residing in the borough. The population density was 2,474.8 people per square mile (954.8/km2). There were 3,630 housing units at an average density of 908.2 per square mile (350.4/km2). The racial makeup of the borough was 93.40% White, 1.12% African American, 0.02% Native American, 2.26% Asian, 1.97% from other races, and 1.22% from two or more races. Hispanic or Latino of any race were 6.37% of the population.

As of the 2000 Census, 37.2% of town residents were of Italian ancestry, the seventh-highest percentage of any municipality in the United States, and second-highest in New Jersey (behind Hammonton, at 45.9%), among all places with more than 1,000 residents identifying their ancestry.

There were 3,539 households, out of which 26.4% had children under the age of 18 living with them, 60.3% were married couples living together, 10.5% had a female householder with no husband present, and 25.3% were non-families. Of all households 21.8% were made up of individuals, and 12.5% had someone living alone who was 65 years of age or older. The average household size was 2.63 and the average family size was 3.09.

In the borough the population was spread out, with 18.3% under the age of 18, 7.0% from 18 to 24, 28.3% from 25 to 44, 25.1% from 45 to 64, and 21.4% who were 65 years of age or older. The median age was 43 years. For every 100 females, there were 89.5 males. For every 100 females age 18 and over, there were 85.6 males.

The median income for a household in the borough was $60,408, and the median income for a family was $69,354. Males had a median income of $44,462 versus $33,869 for females. The per capita income for the borough was $26,561. About 0.8% of families and 4.1% of the population were below the poverty line, including none of those under age 18 and 5.3% of those age 65 or over.

Economy 
Big M, a privately held American clothing retailer which operates the brands Mandee, Annie Sez and Afaze, is based in Totowa.  Big M filed for bankruptcy protection in 2013, precipitated by damage from Hurricane Sandy.

The headquarters of Greater Community Bancorp was located in the borough. The bank operated 16 branches in North Jersey until its 2008 acquisition by Valley National Bank.

Sports 
The Totowa Police Athletic League (PAL) is a volunteer organization that offers several sports to the children of Totowa from pre-kindergarten to eighth grade.  Established in 1952, the PAL strives to provide children throughout the borough with the fellowship of sports.  These include baseball, softball, basketball, soccer, football, hockey, and cheerleading.  Although the Totowa PAL is independent from the Borough of Totowa, it uses fields and facilities owned by the municipality.  Meetings, registrations, and events are held at the PAL building, built in 1963 and located on Chamberlain Avenue.

In 1961–1962, the New York Gladiators of the short-lived National Bowling League rolled its home matches at "Gladiator Arena", a converted movie theater in Totowa.

Government

Local government
Totowa is governed under the Borough form of New Jersey municipal government, which is used in 218 municipalities (of the 564) statewide, making it the most common form of government in New Jersey. The governing body is comprised of a mayor and a borough council, with all positions elected at-large on a partisan basis as part of the November general election. A mayor is elected directly by the voters to a four-year term of office. The borough council is comprised of six members elected to serve three-year terms on a staggered basis, with two seats coming up for election each year in a three-year cycle. The borough form of government is a "weak mayor / strong council" government in which council members act as the legislative body with the mayor presiding at meetings and voting only in the event of a tie. The mayor can veto ordinances, subject to an override by a two-thirds majority vote of the council. The mayor makes committee and liaison assignments for council members, and most appointments are made by the mayor with the council's advice and consent.

, the Mayor of Totowa is Republican John Coiro, whose term of office ends December 31, 2026. Members of the Totowa Borough Council are Council President Lou D'Angelo (R, 2025), Debbie Andriani (R, 2023), William Bucher Jr. (R, 2023), John F. Capo (R, 2025), Patrick Fierro (R, 2024) and Anthony L. Picarelli (R, 2024).

Councilmember John Waryas resigned from office in June 2014, citing personal issues. That month, the Borough Council selected Brendan Murphy from three candidates nominated by the Republican municipal committee to fill Waryas' vacant seat on an interim basis. In the November 2014 general election, Phil Puglise was elected to serve the balance of the term of office.

Federal, state and county representation 
Totowa is located in the 11th Congressional District and is part of New Jersey's 40th state legislative district. Prior to the 2011 reapportionment following the 2010 Census, Totowa had been in the 35th state legislative district.

 

Passaic County is governed by Board of County Commissioners, comprised of seven members who are elected at-large to staggered three-year terms office on a partisan basis, with two or three seats coming up for election each year as part of the November general election in a three-year cycle. At a reorganization meeting held in January, the board selects a Director and Deputy Director from among its members to serve for a one-year term. 
, Passaic County's Commissioners are 
Director Bruce James (D, Clifton, term as commissioner ends December 31, 2023; term as director ends 2022),
Deputy Director Cassandra "Sandi" Lazzara (D, Little Falls, term as commissioner ends 2024; term as deputy director ends 2022),
John W. Bartlett (D, Wayne, 2024),
Theodore O. "T.J." Best Jr. (D, Paterson, 2023),
Terry Duffy (D, West Milford, 2022),
Nicolino Gallo (R, Totowa, 2024) and 
Pasquale "Pat" Lepore (D, Woodland Park, 2022).
Constitutional officers, elected on a countywide basis are
County Clerk Danielle Ireland-Imhof (D, Hawthorne, 2023),
Sheriff Richard H. Berdnik (D, Clifton, 2022) and 
Surrogate Zoila S. Cassanova (D, Wayne, 2026).

Politics
As of March 2011, there were a total of 6,950 registered voters in Totowa, of which 1,355 (19.5% vs. 31.0% countywide) were registered as Democrats, 2,562 (36.9% vs. 18.7%) were registered as Republicans and 3,030 (43.6% vs. 50.3%) were registered as Unaffiliated. There were 3 voters registered as Libertarians or Greens. Among the borough's 2010 Census population, 64.3% (vs. 53.2% in Passaic County) were registered to vote, including 80.5% of those ages 18 and over (vs. 70.8% countywide).

In the 2012 presidential election, Republican Mitt Romney received 57.2% of the vote (2,834 cast), ahead of Democrat Barack Obama with 42.1% (2,083 votes), and other candidates with 0.7% (35 votes), among the 5,004 ballots cast by the borough's 7,265 registered voters (52 ballots were spoiled), for a turnout of 68.9%. In the 2008 presidential election, Republican John McCain received 3,118 votes (58.0% vs. 37.7% countywide), ahead of Democrat Barack Obama with 2,026 votes (37.7% vs. 58.8%) and other candidates with 63 votes (1.2% vs. 0.8%), among the 5,375 ballots cast by the borough's 7,013 registered voters, for a turnout of 76.6% (vs. 70.4% in Passaic County). In the 2004 presidential election, Republican George W. Bush received 2,981 votes (57.1% vs. 42.7% countywide), ahead of Democrat John Kerry with 2,029 votes (38.8% vs. 53.9%) and other candidates with 24 votes (0.5% vs. 0.7%), among the 5,224 ballots cast by the borough's 6,686 registered voters, for a turnout of 78.1% (vs. 69.3% in the whole county).

In the 2013 gubernatorial election, Republican Chris Christie received 68.2% of the vote (2,201 cast), ahead of Democrat Barbara Buono with 31.3% (1,009 votes), and other candidates with 0.5% (15 votes), among the 3,338 ballots cast by the borough's 7,323 registered voters (113 ballots were spoiled), for a turnout of 45.6%. In the 2009 gubernatorial election, Republican Chris Christie received 2,299 votes (60.3% vs. 43.2% countywide), ahead of Democrat Jon Corzine with 1,236 votes (32.4% vs. 50.8%), Independent Chris Daggett with 142 votes (3.7% vs. 3.8%) and other candidates with 29 votes (0.8% vs. 0.9%), among the 3,811 ballots cast by the borough's 6,967 registered voters, yielding a 54.7% turnout (vs. 42.7% in the county).

Emergency services

Police
The Borough of Totowa Police Department, located within the Totowa Municipal Building on Totowa Road, is responsible for law enforcement.

Fire
The Totowa Fire Department (TFD) is an entirely volunteer fire department and was established in April 1908. The TFD consists of four "companies:" Volunteer Fire Company #1 (1908), Lincoln Fire Company (1908), Riverview Fire Company #3 (1925), and Fire Rescue Company #4 (1955). The TFD consists of 98 volunteer firefighters.

Ambulance
The Borough of Totowa First Aid Squad was founded in 1951 to provide a free, volunteer based service to the residents of Totowa. The Borough of Totowa First Aid Squad Auxiliary was also formed to help raise funds to support and benefit the first aid squad. During the day, between the hours of 6:00 am and 6:00 pm, the emergency services are provided by mutual aid agreements with surrounding municipalities or private ambulance companies.

Office of Emergency Management
The Borough of Totowa OEM is responsible for organizing, aiding, and providing emergency response units in the case of a "state of local disaster emergency".  The OEM recruits volunteers of various disciplines to respond to local disasters and collaborates with both county and state officials in the event of a disaster.

Education 
Public school students in pre-kindergarten through eighth grade are educated by the Totowa Borough Public Schools. As of the 2018–19 school year, the district, comprised of two schools, had an enrollment of 1,014 students and 78.0 classroom teachers (on an FTE basis), for a student–teacher ratio of 13.0:1. Schools in the district (with 2018–19 enrollment data from the National Center for Education Statistics) are 
Memorial School with 352 students in pre-kindergarten through second grade and 
Washington Park School with 626 students in grades three through eight.

For ninth through twelfth grades, public school students attend Passaic Valley Regional High School, which also serves students from Little Falls Township and Woodland Park (formerly West Paterson). The high school facility is located in Little Falls Township. As of the 2018–19 school year, the high school had an enrollment of 1,186 students and 102.0 classroom teachers (on an FTE basis), for a student–teacher ratio of 11.6:1. The seats on the high school district's nine-member board of education are allocated based on the population of the constituent municipalities, with three seats assigned to Totowa.

Students going into high school also have the ability to apply for Passaic County Technical Institute, a high school in Wayne that is available to most children living within Passaic County. Students apply for different trades within the application for the school. The school itself is free but does require acceptance to attend. An estimated 80 students from Totowa attend PCTI (Passaic County Technical Institute) as of 2018.

The Academy of St. Francis of Assisi is a K–8 Catholic school that operates under the supervision of the Roman Catholic Diocese of Paterson.

Transportation

Roads and highways

Totowa is located on several major roadways, including Interstate 80 and U.S. Route 46.  Nearby roadways include New Jersey Route 23, New Jersey Route 3, and the Garden State Parkway.  Totowa is also crisscrossed by several Passaic County Routes, including New Jersey Route 62, CR 632, CR 642 and CR 644. There are several crossings of the Upper Passaic River.

Public transportation
NJ Transit provides bus service to and from the Port Authority Bus Terminal in Midtown Manhattan on the 193 and 197 routes, and local service on the 712 route. Train service is available on the Montclair-Boonton Line at the Little Falls station.

Points of interest
 Annie's Road is a section of Riverview Drive between Totowa Road and Union Boulevard, which is rumored to be haunted by the ghost of a young woman killed in an accident.
 Totowa was home to the North Jersey Developmental Center, which serves 400 developmentally disabled citizens on its  campus. The state announced a plan that would close the center in Totowa and another in Woodbridge Township, as part of a plan in which residents of the centers would be dispersed to smaller, community-based housing programs.
 There are more dead people than living in Totowa, as the borough includes four active cemeteries: Holy Sepulchre Roman Catholic Cemetery, Laurel Grove Memorial Park, Mount Nebo Jewish Cemetery and the A.M. White Lodge Jewish Cemetery.

Media and culture
Totowa is located within the New York media market, with most of its daily papers available for sale or delivery. The area is also served by The Record and The Star-Ledger, which cover northern New Jersey.

A segment of the April 12, 2013, episode of the American version of the reality television series Undercover Boss was filmed in Totowa. In the segment, Tony Wells, the CMO for the home security provider ADT, visits Totowa to pose as a new employee being trained as a local sales representative.

Notable people 

People who were born in, residents of, or otherwise closely associated with Totowa include:

 Plaxico Burress (born 1977), NFL wide receiver who played for both the New York Giants and New York Jets
 Jeff Chase (born 1968), film and television actor who played for the Albany Firebirds of the Arena Football League
 Kristin Corrado (born 1965), politician who represents the 40th Legislative District in the New Jersey Senate
 Lou Duva (1922–2017), boxing trainer, along with his promoter sons, Dan and Dino. Their offices remain in the borough
 D. C. Fontana (1939–2019), television script writer and story editor, best known for her work on the original Star Trek franchise and several western television series
 Kyle Gurrieri (born 1998), professional soccer player who plays for the Wilmington Hammerheads FC of the United Soccer League
 Lady Clover Honey, drag queen, comedian and television correspondent
 Ralph J. Marra Jr. (born 1953), acting United States Attorney for the District of New Jersey from December 2008 to October 2009
 Juelz Santana (born 1982), rapper and actor, who has been a member of East Coast hip hop group The Diplomats
 Ernie Smith (1899–1973), shortstop who played for the Chicago White Sox
 John Spencer (1946–2005), actor best known for his work on The West Wing
 Mike Sullivan (born 1967), quarterback coach for the Denver Broncos
 Hubert Sumlin (1931–2011), guitarist for Howlin' Wolf who was a five-time Grammy Award Nominee and was inducted into the Blues Hall of Fame in 2008

References

External links

Totowa Borough website
Totowa Public Schools website

School data for the Totowa Borough Public Schools, National Center for Education Statistics
Passaic Valley Regional High School
Borough of Totowa First Aid Squad
TotowaStuff.com: Totowa's first interactive community website
Laurie Giardino's photographic memoir, The Totowa Book of the Dead
St. James of the Marches
Totowa PAL website
Passaic Valley Today newspaper

 
1898 establishments in New Jersey
Borough form of New Jersey government
Boroughs in Passaic County, New Jersey
Populated places established in 1898